Carlo Lodoli  (1690 – October 27, 1761) was an Italian architectural theorist, Franciscan priest, mathematician and teacher, whose work anticipated modernist notions of functionalism and truth to materials. He claimed that architectural forms and proportions should be derived from the abilities of the material being used. He is sometimes referred to as the Socrates of architecture since his own writings have been lost his theories are only known from the works of others. Together with architects and architectural theorists including Claude Perrault, Abbé Jean-Louis de Cordemoy, Abbé Marc-Antoine Laugier, Lodoli articulated a rational architecture which challenged the prevailing Baroque and Rococo styles.

Girolamo Zanetti records that after 20 years of writing Lodoli finished his treatise on architecture but refused to publish it. Instead Francesco Algarotti endeavoured to publicise Lodoli's thinking in his own work Saggio sopra l'architettura (1757) albeit in a somewhat watered down form, emphasising imitation rather than Lodoli's daring anti-Baroque rationalism. It was Andrea Memmo who attempted to do justice to Lodoli's theories in his work Elementi d'architettura lodoliana (1786) published one year before the first edition of the only book bearing Lodoli's name, Apologhi immaginati (1787); a collection remarks and tales, often paradoxical in nature, told to his friends and pupils. Another pupil of Lodoli's, Francesco Milizia (1725–1798) published a long treatise, Principles of Civic Architecture (1781), which presented an exhaustive architectural system inspired by contemporary science.

Lodoli spent the years 1739 to 1751 in the office of Padre Generale Commissario di Terra Santa in Venice, here he committed himself to the restoration (1739–43) of the pilgrim's hospice attached to the monastery. This was his only built architectural work.

References

External links
PhD dissertation on Carlo Lodoli by Marc J. Neveu: Architectural Lessons of Carlo Lodoli (1690-1761): Indole of Material and of Self 

Architectural theoreticians
1690 births
1761 deaths
18th-century Italian architects
Italian architecture writers
Italian Franciscans